Thomas Ewyn (died 1569) was a Scottish goldsmith working in Edinburgh.

His brother may have been the chaplain and scribe, Robert Ewyn.

Thomas Ewyn was Deacon of the Goldsmiths. Ewyn was involved in planning the civic celebrations in Edinburgh for the return of Mary, Queen of Scots to Scotland in 1561. Ewyn, speaking on behalf of the Deacons of the Crafts, discussed finances for the event at a meeting of the burgh council on 27 August 1561.

On 24 September 1561, Ewyn presented candidates for election to the council, including his fellow goldsmith Michael Gilbert, a skinner Michael Turnet, the mason Thomas Jackson, blacksmith Nicol Purves, and the carpenter David Schang. The council argued with Ewyn that there should be 12 candidates for the two places allotted to the Crafts.

On 8 October 1561 Queen Mary disputed the election of the council. Ewyn wanted it put on record that he had voted for Thomas McCalzean as Provost of Edinburgh, on account of his ability and qualifications, and would otherwise have according to the queen's direction, if she had preferred a candidate. McCalzean was made Provost.

Thomas Ewyn died on 10 May 1569. His will mentions that he had loaned goldsmith's files and a quantity of salammoniac, used to refine gold and silver, to another goldsmith, Alexander Gilbert.

References

1569 deaths
Scottish goldsmiths
Businesspeople from Edinburgh